Lapidoth ( Lapīḏōṯ, "torches") was the husband of Deborah the fourth Judge of Israel. Lapidoth is also a Hebrew male given name.

References

Book of Judges people

rnfdjkfejnmjytdwygvjh;lpuh89ygf7tvuhb jkkovij9h87dgtvyguhj kniuh8y7gct6vygh bj